OWG, standing for Off We Go, is a Canadian virtual airline and division of charter airline Nolinor Aviation. It operates flights to leisure destinations from Montréal Trudeau and Toronto Pearson airports.

History
On July 6, 2020, Nolinor Aviation announced OWG as its new airline. The airline planned to operate a fleet of Boeing 737-400 aircraft in an all-economy configuration of 158 seats, targeting leisure travel to southern destinations. On July 13, 2020, OWG announced that it would partner with Canadian travel operator Hola Sun Holidays to operate dedicated flights to Cuba on behalf of the company. Its inaugural flight to Cuba departed on December 18, 2020, having originally been planned for August 31, 2020, while the airline operated charter flights within Canada for an interim period beginning on October 18, 2020.

The company ceased its flights to the Caribbean in 2021 at the request of the Canadian government, as a result of the COVID-19 pandemic. The company planned to restart flights in late 2021 using one Boeing 737-800 aircraft, although the 737-800 did not enter service until 2022.

Destinations
, OWG has operated to the following destinations:

Fleet
The OWG fleet, which is operated by Nolinor Aviation under its air operator's certificate (AOC), comprises the following aircraft :

References

Airlines of Canada
Airlines established in 2020